James Grant (born 22 May 1964) is an Australian rugby footballer who played international rugby union and played rugby league professionally in England and Australia.

Early years
Grant attended Canowindra Central School and St Stanislaus' College in Bathurst where he made the school's First XV.

Playing career
He joined the Orange City rugby union club in 1983. He represented New South Wales Country before moving to Kiama in 1984 for two seasons where he represented Illawarra, NSW County and New South Wales. He returned to Orange in 1986 and played for NSW. In 1987 he played for the Gordon club in Sydney. He again returned to Orange in 1988 and made both the NSW and Australian sides.

Grant switched to rugby league in 1989, joining the Balmain Tigers in the NSWRL Premiership. He was part of the Tigers side that played in the grand final that season and stayed with the club until 1992. He had found it difficult to maintain his first grade place with the Tigers and moved to Hull F.C. for the 1992/93 season.

References

1964 births
Living people
Australian rugby league players
Australian rugby union players
Australia international rugby union players
Balmain Tigers players
Western Reds players
Hull F.C. players
Rugby league wingers
Rugby league centres
Rugby union wings
Rugby league players from New South Wales
Rugby union players from New South Wales